Sir Raphael Herman Tuck (5 April 1910 – 1 July 1982) was a British Labour Party politician and an academic and lawyer.

Born in Cricklewood, London in 1910, Tuck was the son of David Lionel Tuck and a great-grandson of Raphael Tuck, founder of Raphael Tuck & Sons, an art publishing company which became a leading publisher of postcards. He was educated at St Paul's School and at the universities of London, Cambridge and Harvard. A political scientist and lawyer, he was constitutional advisor to the Premier of Manitoba and worked in special research at the Department of Labour in Ottawa, both in Canada. He became a barrister, called to the bar at Gray's Inn in 1951. He was Professor of Law at the University of Saskatchewan, Canada and Professor of Political Science at McGill University, Montreal, Canada and at Tulane University, New Orleans, United States.

Tuck was elected as the Member of Parliament (MP) for the English constituency of Watford in the Parliament of the United Kingdom in 1964, serving until 1979.

References

External links
 

1910 births
1982 deaths
Harvard University alumni
Labour Party (UK) MPs for English constituencies
People educated at St Paul's School, London
Academic staff of McGill University
Academic staff of the University of Saskatchewan
UK MPs 1964–1966
UK MPs 1966–1970
UK MPs 1970–1974
UK MPs 1974
UK MPs 1974–1979
Knights Bachelor
British political scientists
Members of Gray's Inn
Tulane University faculty
20th-century political scientists